This article contains the latest list of Michelin starred restaurants in Hong Kong and Macau in 2021 and 2022. The 2009 edition was the first edition of the Michelin Guide to Hong Kong and Macau to be published, making Hong Kong and Macau the second and third Asian territory to receive a Michelin guide, after Tokyo, Japan in 2008.

Alphabetic list

2021 - 2022

2009 - 2020

See also
 List of restaurants in Hong Kong
 List of Michelin 3-star restaurants

References

Lists of restaurants

Restaurants, Michelin starred
Macau-related lists